The Copa América is South America's major tournament in senior men's football and determines the continental champion. Until 1967, the tournament was known as South American Championship. It is the oldest continental championship in the world.

Paraguay can historically be considered South America's 'Best of the Rest' as they are ranked fourth in the Copa Américas All-Time table behind CONMEBOL's big three: Argentina, Uruguay and Brazil.

However, Paraguay's most successful era continentally was in the late 1940s culminating in their first tournament victory in 1953 while in recent decades Paraguay produced mediocre results. Even the 'Golden Generation', which continually qualified and produced good results at the FIFA World Cups from 1998–2010, never advanced beyond the quarter-finals at a Copa América until reaching the final once in 2011.

Overall record

* Includes a 2–2 draw awarded to Peru.

Winning tournaments

1953 South American Championship

After coach Manuel Fleitas Solich took charge of the Paraguay national team in 1947, he developed an already skillful team into title contestants. In 1947 and 1949, Los Guaraníes were consecutive vice-champions.

In 1949 and 1953 Paraguay was in the same situation before their last match of the group phase: Anything less than a win against Brazil would mean tournament victory for the opponent, while a win would force both teams into a play-off. Both times Paraguay won 2–1.

In the 1949 play-off, Brazil thrashed Paraguay 7–0 on home soil, taking revenge for the group match defeat along with tournament victory. In 1953 however, the Paraguayan's scored two early goals in the play-off, and led 3–0 by half-time, winning the match 3–2.

1979 Copa América

1979 was the second edition of a revised Copa América which was not held as a local tournament, but spread over several months in a number of home-and-away-matches. In the group phase, opponent Uruguay slipped up in their first match against Ecuador, losing 1–2, and were held at bay by Paraguay with two draws. A closely contested semi-final saw Paraguay win 4–3 on aggregate over Brazil.

The rules for the final against Chile were that a play-off on neutral ground was to be played if the teams were equal on points after two legs. Goal difference would only come into play if the play-off also ended in a draw. After a 3–0 home win, but a 1–0 away defeat, the play-off was scheduled in Buenos Aires six days later. Drawing 0–0, Paraguay won on aggregate goals after that play-off. In total, Paraguay had to play nine matches to be crowned champions, a tournament record tied with Peru, who went through a similar ordeal four years earlier.

Record by opponent

Paraguay's highest victory at a Copa América was a 7–0 against Bolivia in 1949. Their highest defeat was a 0–8 against Argentina in 1926.

Record players

Top goalscorers

Awards and records

Team Awards
 Champions 2x (1953, 1979)
 Second Place 6x (1922, 1929, 1947, 1949, 1963, 2011)
 Third Place 7x (1923, 1924, 1925, 1939, 1959 (ARG), 1983)

Individual Awards
 Most Valuable Player 1953: Heriberto Herrera
 Top Scorer 1929: Aurelio González (5 goals)
 Top Scorer 1979: Eugenio Morel (4 goals) (shared)
 Best Goalkeeper 2011: Justo Villar

See also

Paraguay at the FIFA World Cup

References

External links
RSSSF archives and results
Soccerway database

Countries at the Copa América
Paraguay national football team